Feltsman is a surname. Notable people with the surname include:

Oscar Feltsman (1921–2013), Ukrainian-born Soviet/Russian composer
Vladimir Feltsman (born 1952), Russian-American classical pianist

See also
Feldman
Feldmann
Feltman